Linda Hanley (born 8 June 1960) is an American beach volleyball player, born in Laguna Hills, California. She competed in the women's tournament at the 1996 Summer Olympics in Atlanta, with teammate Barbra Fontana.

References

External links

1960 births
Living people
People from Laguna Hills, California
American women's beach volleyball players
Olympic beach volleyball players of the United States
Beach volleyball players at the 1996 Summer Olympics
21st-century American women
UCLA Bruins women's volleyball players